A killdeer is a type of bird.

Killdeer may also refer to:

 Killdeer, Saskatchewan, Canada
 Killdeer, North Dakota, U.S.

See also
 Kildeer, Illinois, U.S.
 Battle of Killdeer Mountain, a battle in the U.S. Army's 1864 Expedition against the Sioux, in Dakota Territory